Elk City Bridge was a covered bridge spanning the Yaquina River at Elk City in Lincoln County in the U.S. state of Oregon. It was destroyed by a storm on November 13, 1981.

The original bridge, built by the county in 1922 for $3,200, was a  Howe truss span with  vertical clearance and a 15-ton load limit supported by wooden pilings that suffered from rot.  The county planned to remove the bridge in 1980, but fundraising for repairs had gathered $20,000, and restoration had begun when high winds caused another $90,000 damage to the structure. The county did not have enough money for restoration or to pursue an insurance settlement through the courts.

The bridge, added to the National Register of Historic Places in 1979, was delisted after its destruction.

See also
 List of bridges on the National Register of Historic Places in Oregon
 List of Oregon covered bridges
 National Register of Historic Places listings in Lincoln County, Oregon

References

External links
Photo of the bridge in 1957 – Oregon Historic Photograph Collections

1922 establishments in Oregon
1981 disestablishments in Oregon
Bridges completed in 1922
Covered bridges on the National Register of Historic Places in Oregon
Bridges in Lincoln County, Oregon
Demolished bridges in Oregon
Demolished buildings and structures in Oregon
Former National Register of Historic Places in Oregon
Wooden bridges in Oregon
National Register of Historic Places in Lincoln County, Oregon
Road bridges on the National Register of Historic Places in Oregon